James Kelso (8 January 1869 – 25 July 1900) was a Scottish footballer who played as a right half. he was the younger brother of Scotland international player Bob Kelso. He began his career with Renton before joining Liverpool in 1892 for their inaugural season. He made one appearance for Liverpool, in a 4–0 win over Bury in the Lancashire League on 24 September 1892. He rejoined Renton in 1893. Kelso committed suicide at the age of 31.

References

External links
 James Kelso at LiverpoolFC.com

1869 births
1900 deaths
Liverpool F.C. players
Renton F.C. players
Scottish footballers
Suicides in Scotland
People from Cardross, Argyll and Bute
Association football wing halves
Sportspeople from Argyll and Bute
1900 suicides